In chemistry, hexahydro-1,3,5-triazine is a class of heterocyclic compounds with the formula (CH2NR)3. They are reduced derivatives of 1,3,5-triazine, which have the formula (CHN)3, a family of aromatic heterocycles. They are often called triazacyclohexanes or TACH's but this acronym is also applied to cis,cis-1,3,5-triaminocyclohexane.

Preparation
The parent hexahydro-1,3,5-triazine ((CH2NH)3) has been detected as an intermediate in the condensation of formaldehyde and ammonia, a reaction that affords hexamethylene tetraamine. The N-substituted derivatives are more stable. These N,N',N''-trisubstituted hexahydro-1,3,5-triazines arise from the condensation of the amine and formaldehyde as illustrated by the route to 1,3,5-trimethyl-1,3,5-triazacyclohexane:
 3 CH2O  +  3 H2NMe   →   (CH2NMe)3  +  3 H2O
The C-substituted derivatives are obtained by reaction of aldehydes and ammonia:
3 RCHO  +  3 NH3   →   (RCHNH)3  +  3 H2O
Known as aldehyde ammonias, these compounds characteristically crystallize with water.  1-Alkanolamines are intermediates in these condensation reactions.

The N,N',N"-triacyltriazines are trizines with acyl groups attached to the three nitrogen centers of the ring.  These triacyltriazines arise from the reaction of hexamethylene tetraamine with acid chlorides or the condensation of amides with formaldehyde.

Unlike the parent triazines, the hexahydro derivatives are conformationally flexible.

Related compounds and derivatives

Trimers of isocyanates are sometimes labeled as 2,4,6-trioxohexahydro-1,3,5-triazines. They have the formula (RNC(O))3 and based on the isocyanuric (trione) tautomer of cyanuric acid.

The N,N',N"-hexahydro-1,3,5-triazines function as tridentate ligands, which are called TACH (triazacyclohexanes).  Examples include Mo(CO)3[(CH2)3(NMe)3] formed from the TACH ligand and molybdenum hexacarbonyl.

Hexahydro-1,3,5-triazine polymers have also been synthesized.

References

Amines
Triazines